Jennings Township is one of the fifteen townships of Putnam County, Ohio, United States.  The 2000 census found 1,968 people in the township, 1,536 of whom lived in the unincorporated portions of the township.

Geography
Located in the southwestern corner of the county, it borders the following townships:
Jackson Township - north
Union Township - northeast corner
Sugar Creek Township - east
Sugar Creek Township, Allen County - southeast corner
Marion Township, Allen County - south
Washington Township, Van Wert County - southwest
Monterey Township - northwest

The village of Fort Jennings is located in northwestern Jennings Township.

Name and history
Jennings Township was organized in the 1830s, but the exact date is uncertain since records were destroyed. Statewide, the only other Jennings Township is located in Van Wert County.

Government
The township is governed by a three-member board of trustees, who are elected in November of odd-numbered years to a four-year term beginning on the following January 1. Two are elected in the year after the presidential election and one is elected in the year before it. There is also an elected township fiscal officer, who serves a four-year term beginning on April 1 of the year after the election, which is held in November of the year before the presidential election. Vacancies in the fiscal officership or on the board of trustees are filled by the remaining trustees.

References

External links
County website

Townships in Putnam County, Ohio
Townships in Ohio